HMS Magicienne was the lead ship of her class of two 16-gun, steam-powered second-class paddle frigates built for the Royal Navy in the 1850s. Commissioned in 1853 she played a small role in the Crimean War of 1854–1855 and was sold for scrap in 1866.

Design and construction
Their crew numbered 175 officers and ratings.

The ships were fitted with a pair of 2-cylinder oscillating steam engines, rated at 400 nominal horsepower, that drove their paddlewheels. The ships were armed with eight 32-pounder (56 cwt) cannon on the gundeck.

Magicienne and her sister ship  were originally ordered on 25 April 1847 as first-class sloops to John Edye's design, approved on 12 August 1847. On 5 August they were re-ordered as  vessels. When completed, they constituted the last group of paddle warships built for the Royal Navy.

Career

Magicienne was laid down at Pembroke Dockyard in September 1847, launched on 7 March 1849 and completed on 20 February 1853. The ship was sent to the Baltic Sea during the Crimean War. She was sold for scrap to Marshall of Plymouth in September 1866.

Notes

Citations

References

External links
 

1849 ships
Frigates of the Royal Navy
Victorian-era frigates of the United Kingdom
Ships built in Pembroke Dock